Pascual Álvarez y de Jésus (1861–1923) was a Filipino general during the Philippine Revolution and member of the Magdiwang revolutionary organization. He was a nephew of Mariano Álvarez.

Born to Sebastian Álvarez and Juana de Jésus, Álvarez was a self-made man and had no formal education. He only did self-study and was employed as a clerk in the municipal office of Noveleta, Cavite. Later, he was elected cabeza de barangay, then teniente mayor, juez de paz ("Justice of the Peace"), and eventually elected as capitan municipal from 1893-1894. Álvarez was later named general secretary of the Katipunan's Magdiwang Council of Noveleta. He, together with his cousin Santiago and uncle Mariano, led the recapture of the Noveleta Tribunal (municipal hall) from Spanish forces on August 31, 1896. Álvarez later accepted the inaugural post of secretary of the interior in the revolutionary cabinet of General Emilio Aguinaldo. He was also present during the Pact of Biak-na-Bato as a truce to end the Philippine Revolution.

Álvarez was captured by the Americans in 1900 during the Philippine-American War. He was later appointed municipal president of Noveleta from 1902 to 1903 and was elected vice mayor from 1904 to 1907.

He married twice: first with Marciana Villanueva, a cousin of Magdiwang's General Ariston Villanueva, who died on October 20, 1890, and later with Ildefonsa Angkiko. Alvarez died on March 8, 1923, at the age of 61.

References

People of the Philippine Revolution
People of the Philippine–American War
1861 births
1923 deaths
Filipino generals
People from Cavite
Members of the Philippine Independent Church
Secretaries of the Interior and Local Government of the Philippines
Aguinaldo administration cabinet members